The second generation of iPad Pro is a line of iPad tablet computers designed, developed and marketed by Apple Inc. The iPads, with 12.9 inch and 10.5 inch screens, were both announced on June 5, 2017. Both models are compatible with the first generation of Apple Pencil. Like the first generation, a larger size and stylus compatibility were a point of difference from the rest of Apple's available iPads.

Upgrades from the first-generation iPad Pro include the more powerful A10X Fusion processor, storage capacity up to 512 GB and the larger display of the 10.5 inch model (upgraded from a 9.7 inch model) while the 12.9 inch model was refreshed. Following the 2017 announcement, the first-generation models were discontinued.

The 12.9 inch version was discontinued on October 30, 2018 after the announcement of the 3rd-generation iPad Pro. However, the 10.5 inch version continued in production along with the 11 inch version until March 18, 2019 when the iPad Air (3rd generation) was announced.

Features 
The second-generation iPad Pro was announced on June 5, 2017, alongside iOS 11 at WWDC 2017. The two models, the 10.5-inch and 12.9-inch, have a upgraded A10X SoC which features a 6-core CPU with a 12-core GPU, Apple's ProMotion display technology which supports HDR10 and Dolby Vision content (with iOS 11 or later) with a 120 Hz refresh rate and their True Tone display is 50 percent brighter than the earlier models; both sizes also have a 12-megapixel rear-facing camera with quad-LED True-Tone flash and a 7-megapixel front-facing camera with Retina Flash. They have USB 3.0 connection speeds using Lightning cables, with USB-C fast-charge support. The second-generation iPad Pro has storage capacities up to 512 GB (1 GB = 1 billion bytes). The second-generation iPad Pro is the final model to include a home button with Touch ID, with the third-generation model replacing it with gestures for navigation and Face ID replacing Touch ID for authentication purposes.

Reception
Max Parker from TrustedReviews and Gareth Beavis from TechRadar both praised the 10.5-inch model's high-quality audio and performance, but did note that it was expensive.

Reviewing the 12.9 inch second-generation iPad Pro, Lauren Goode of The Verge complimented the high quality camera, A10X processor and large screen size, but argued that the device could have been cheaper.

Hardware issues
Reports indicate that the display of the 12.9 inch second-generation iPad Pro has a high propensity of experiencing a "backlight bleed" failure, manifested as brighter halos of light bleeding through one edge of the screen.

The 2nd generation iPad Pro and The 3rd generation iPad Air models can develop a have bright white light on the display which is located above the home button.

Timeline

See also
 Pen computing
 Graphics tablet

References

External links

Pro
iPad Pro
Tablet computers
Touchscreen portable media players
Tablet computers introduced in 2017
Foxconn